Tangri may refer to:

Tangri (god), a Turkic pagan celestial chief divinity who personifies Heaven
Tangri river, a seasonal river in Haryana, India
Nina Tangri, Canadian politician
Roger Tangri (born 1941), British professor of political science
Sandra Schwartz Tangri (1936–2003), American feminist psychologist